Nothing More Than Murder is a 1949 crime novel by Jim Thompson.

Plot
An unscrupulous owner of a movie theater in a small town, Joe Wilmot, in an unhappy marriage and squeezed by the theater chains, concocts a murderous plot involving his wife and his lover. Wilmot's scheme unravels slowly as he finds out that his predicament was worse than he thought and that his friends and adversaries more vicious. Also known as Murder at the Bijou.

References

1949 American novels
Novels by Jim Thompson
Harper & Brothers books
English-language novels